Willow Grove is an unincorporated area and census-designated place (CDP) in McLennan County, Texas, United States. It was first listed as a CDP prior to the 2020 census.

It is in the central part of the county, on the southwest side of Texas State Highway 6.

References 

Populated places in McLennan County, Texas
Census-designated places in McLennan County, Texas
Census-designated places in Texas